The 1883 New Jersey gubernatorial election was held on November 6, 1883. Democratic nominee Leon Abbett defeated Republican nominee Jonathan Dixon with 49.93% of the vote.

General election

Candidates
Leon Abbett, corporation counsel for Jersey City and former State Senator for Hudson County (Democratic)
Jonathan Dixon, Jersey City judge (Republican)
Solomon Parsons, (Prohibition)
Benjamin Urner, (Greenback)

Results

References

1880
New Jersey
Gubernatorial
November 1883 events